WCGV-TV (channel 24) was a television station in Milwaukee, Wisconsin, United States, which operated from 1980 to 2018. In its latter years, it was owned by Sinclair Broadcast Group as an affiliate of MyNetworkTV; it had common ownership with CW affiliate WVTV (channel 18). WCGV-TV's operations were last housed at WVTV's studio facilities on Milwaukee's northwest side; the station's transmitter was located on the Milwaukee PBS tower on North Humboldt Boulevard in Milwaukee's Estabrook Park neighborhood.

Established in 1980 as an independent station with part-time subscription television operation, WCGV-TV served as the first Fox affiliate for Milwaukee from 1987 to 1994. It then affiliated with UPN after it lost the Fox affiliation in a national realignment. After UPN was merged into The CW in 2006, it was aligned with MyNetworkTV.

On January 8, 2018, WCGV-TV's broadcast license was surrendered after Sinclair sold the station's spectrum in the 2016 Federal Communications Commission (FCC) incentive auction. At that time, the station's programming continued as subchannels of WVTV, continuing to use virtual channel 24. What was WCGV-TV's primary subchannel continues under the WVTV license as "My 24".

History

Establishment
WCGV-TV first signed on the air on March 24, 1980, under the ownership of B&F Broadcasting from the former North 27th Street facilities of then-CBS affiliate WITI (channel 6), which had moved to a new facility in Brown Deer two years earlier in 1978. At the time, it operated as an independent station and ran religious programs, older movies, cartoons and drama series during the day, along with select CBS and NBC programs that WITI and WTMJ-TV (channel 4) declined to air (such as the 1983 Match Game-Hollywood Squares Hour and CBS Late Night). It also produced a two-hour local afternoon talk program called Tempo 24, which aired from 1980 to 1981. At night, the station ran programming from subscription television service SelecTV, which required a decoder box and a monthly subscription to view; SelecTV ran mostly first-run feature films, although Friday nights/early Saturday mornings outside of FCC-designated safe harbor hours consisted of adult programming from The Playboy Channel.
 
WCGV dropped SelecTV in 1984 once Warner Cable launched its Milwaukee area operations and brought traditional premium cable networks (such as HBO and Showtime) to the area. It gradually became a more serious ratings contender against Milwaukee's leading independent, future sister station WVTV (channel 18). The station was branded simply as "TV-24". By then, the station had been acquired by Arlington Broadcasting, which also owned WTTO in Birmingham, WQTV (now WBPX-TV) in Boston and KNXV-TV in Phoenix; the latter two stations were later sold off.

Fox affiliation
On March 15, 1987, WCGV joined the infant network Fox in time for the network's April 5 prime time launch, later taking the branding of "Fox 24". The station joined Fox on the condition that it be allowed to preempt The Late Show, which by the time WCGV acquired the affiliation had lost Joan Rivers as its host and was not doing well in the ratings. The station also wanted to maintain as much of its existing schedule as possible, as WCGV had success counterprogramming the major network affiliates with a 10 p.m. block of two episodes of The Bob Newhart Show every weeknight until 1989, when it was replaced by the syndicated Arsenio Hall Show. From September 1993 until December 1994, the station also carried CBS' Late Show with David Letterman on a half-hour delay in lieu of WITI, which refused to carry the show due to better ratings for reruns of M*A*S*H in the timeslot.

By 1988, the station scored a major coup by acquiring the broadcast rights to the Milwaukee Brewers and the Milwaukee Bucks, both previously seen on WVTV. In the late 1980s, Arlington Broadcasting was sold and became known as HR Broadcasting (as in Hal Roach Studios, of Little Rascals/Our Gang fame). By the end of the 1980s, WCGV had pulled almost even with WVTV in the ratings.
 
WCGV and Birmingham's WTTO were purchased by Abry Communications in 1990. The station continued with its general entertainment format, along with Fox programs. WCGV entered into a local marketing agreement with WVTV (then owned by Gaylord Broadcasting) in 1994. Although WCGV was the senior partner, the combined operation was based at WVTV's original studio facility near North 35th Street and Capitol Drive.

UPN affiliation
In early 1994, WITI was named as the market's new Fox affiliate as a result of a deal between the station's owner New World Communications and Fox as part of the network's decision to upgrade affiliates in certain markets after it acquired the broadcast rights to the National Football Conference of the NFL. For a short time between September and November 1994, the station carried Green Bay Packers games in the market through the network's NFC package as a lame-duck affiliate, though without any pre-game programming, the only break in network coverage by WITI of the team since the 1977 affiliation switch between WISN and WITI, which took place in the off-season.

WCGV lost the Fox affiliation and briefly became an independent station again on December 4, 1994. However, it passed on the CBS affiliation that WITI had dropped as a result of the switch (which went to WDJT-TV, channel 58). Instead, it became a charter affiliate of the United Paramount Network (UPN) on January 16, 1995, following a pattern in which many former Fox affiliates in markets where New World owned a station decided to join either UPN or fellow upstart network The WB if they did not join a Big Three network displaced due to the affiliation switches. Around this time, the station changed its branding to "UPN 24", with a generic logo consisting of the station's call letters and channel number beneath the primary color UPN "shapes" logo of that time.
 
In 1995, Sinclair Broadcast Group acquired WCGV and the other properties owned by Abry's television station group. WVTV was purchased by Glencairn Ltd. (which was headed by former Sinclair executive Edwin Edwards). The Smith family, owners and founders of Sinclair owned 97% of Glencairn's stock, so Sinclair effectively owned both stations. Glencairn was involved in similar deals, owning eleven stations that were all operated by Sinclair under LMAs. This arrangement prompted Jesse Jackson and his Rainbow/PUSH coalition to bring forward litigation, citing their concerns on racial issues in the face of one entity holding two broadcast licenses in a single market. The Federal Communications Commission eventually fined Sinclair $40,000 in 2001 for illegally controlling Glencairn.
 
On January 5, 1998, WCGV/Sinclair decided to drop the UPN affiliation over ratings and monetary issues, as did several other Sinclair stations in other markets after the company signed a lucrative affiliation deal with The WB (which included WVTV; the station affiliated with The WB on May 19,1997 prior to WCGV dropping UPN) to shift several stations from UPN. For eight months, the station reverted to being an independent station, though the only effect on the station's schedule was the replacement of UPN programming with syndicated film packages during prime time and Saturday afternoons, and paid programming in place of UPN Kids on Sunday mornings. A few local cable providers brought in the network's New York City area affiliate WWOR-TV to keep UPN programming available in the Milwaukee area, but for the most part the network was only seen on cable systems on the fringe of the market via WACY-TV in Appleton and WPWR-TV from Chicago; viewers could also choose to pull those stations over-the-air via antenna, along with the network's off-hours affiliation on WOOD-TV/WOTV across the lake in Grand Rapids, Michigan. Otherwise, most providers had dropped WWOR's "superstation" cable feed years before due to uninteresting programming replacing the main signal after SyndEx laws came into place, and the cable feed had been discontinued by satellite distribution rights holder Advance Entertainment Corporation a year earlier to increase distribution for Animal Planet.

However, WCGV did see a viewership decline without a network affiliation. It also received complaints from vocal Star Trek fans who had to pull in Voyager via over-the-air antenna from those out-of-market stations, switch to the Dish Network or PrimeStar satellite services for their "superstation" packages, or acquire the episodes through tape trading. Sinclair would eventually reverse its decision and come to terms with the network, resulting in WCGV rejoining UPN on August 4. On November 8 of that year, WCGV made up for the preemptions by airing an all-day Voyager marathon, showing the thirteen episodes making up the last half of season four that WCGV was not able to air during the second half of the 1997–98 season, with the permission of UPN and Paramount Television. WWOR was dropped from the few area cable systems it was on within days of the re-acquisition of WCGV's UPN affiliation.

Despite the reconciliation, the station continued to omit the mention of UPN from its own branding, and called itself "Channel 24" until the start of the 2001–2002 television season, when it brought back the "UPN 24" branding (one of only a small number of UPN stations to do so, as UPN branding was required by the network). WVTV became wholly owned by Sinclair in 2000, after the FCC overturned regulations that had prohibited television station duopolies.

WITI never held an interest in carrying any of Fox's children's programming after it joined that network due to existing local home showcase programming on Saturday mornings, and wanting to have traditional syndicated programming lead into its weekday local news programming; therefore, Fox Kids continued to air on WCGV for ten years after the affiliation switch (which included the station continuing to maintain a Fox 24 Kids Club through most of these years). However, as time went on, WCGV began to use its own logo bug to cover all Fox logos, and advertised the block sparingly at the behest of UPN (which had its own children's block airing on the station up until it was discontinued in 2003, including a period of time where both blocks were carried back-to-back on weekdays). The station declined to renew the children's block, later known as Fox Box and then 4Kids TV, after the fall of 2004, and subsequently 4Kids TV moved to independent WMLW-CA (channel 41), where it aired on Sunday mornings until it ended on December 28, 2008.

MyNetworkTV affiliation
On March 2, 2006, Sinclair announced that channel 24 would become the Milwaukee affiliate of MyNetworkTV, which was created by Fox Television Stations and Twentieth Television in the wake of the January 24, 2006 announcement that UPN and The WB would cease operations in September 2006, and merge into one network, The CW. WCGV's WB-affiliated sister station WVTV was named as Milwaukee's CW affiliate two months later on May 2, 2006. This resulted in the Milwaukee duopoly becoming one of five MyNetworkTV/CW duopolies owned and/or controlled by Sinclair at the time (the other four are KVMY/KVCW in Las Vegas, WABM/WTTO in Birmingham, Alabama, WUXP/WNAB—itself part of a virtual triopoly with Fox affiliate WZTV—in Nashville, Tennessee, and WRDC/WLFL in Raleigh–Durham, North Carolina).

In the interim two weeks between the beginning of MyNetworkTV's and the end of UPN's existence in early to mid-September, WCGV continued to show select UPN programs on Sunday afternoons, airing Friday Night SmackDown, followed by Girlfriends, Everybody Hates Chris and All of Us from 12–5 p.m., all which were renewed by The CW and moved to channel 18. WCGV is one of the few stations in the country to have been affiliated with both News Corporation-owned networks, Fox and MyNetworkTV.

WCGV-TV carried the 2017 Monster Energy NASCAR Cup Series Bass Pro Shops NRA Night Race at Bristol Motor Speedway from NBC on August 19, 2017 for WTMJ, which was committed to a preseason Green Bay Packers football game.

July 2010 flooding incident and studio move 
On July 22, 2010, the Milwaukee area experienced a major flash flooding event which caused major damage in several parts of Milwaukee County. The studios of WVTV/WCGV are located a half-mile south of Lincoln Creek and the building and technical equipment belonging to the stations suffered major damage, forcing channels 18 and 24 off the air for the majority of the time after 6 p.m. on July 22 until the early morning of July 24; the two stations, once they returned to the air, had their programming fed into their master control facilities via another unknown Sinclair master control. For both stations, this resulted in most of the station's paid programming and other timeslots where the Sinclair facility did not have an episode of a particular series within the schedule replaced with reruns of Coach and advertisements were replaced with direct response national advertising. Both stations eventually resumed local operations later during the week of July 25, but broadcast in 480i standard definition and did not display digital on-screen bugs at all due to damage to the station's high definition broadcasting equipment for most of the following month. HD programming was restored on August 20, 2010.

Because the flooding caused irreparable damage to the building, Sinclair immediately began a search for new facilities for WCGV and WVTV, which would allow locally produced and syndicated programs to be broadcast in high definition full-time without the complexities of rewiring an older and flood damaged studio and master control facility. On June 6, 2012, Sinclair received approval from the Milwaukee Common Council's Zoning, Neighborhoods and Development Committee to move to an existing building near the 41/145 Interchange on Milwaukee's northwest side on Calumet Road in the Park Place office park and install receiving satellite dishes, generators and a studio/transmitter link tower, with full Common Council approval coming a week later on June 12.  The stations moved to the new building in December 2013, with the new master control coming online in the last week of the month.

From June 2012 until the end of December 2013, the engineering and master control of WVTV/WCGV transmitted 16:9 syndicated programming in full screen, but in standard definition as a stopgap solution until the move to the new studios. Upon the opening of the new master control, all syndicated programming available in the format now is aired in high definition.

Spectrum sale and unofficial channel share with WVTV
On April 13, 2017, the results of the FCC's 2016 spectrum auction were announced, with Sinclair successfully selling the UHF spectrum for WCGV for $84.3 million. At first, it was expected that WCGV's channels would be merged onto WVTV's spectrum in a formal channel-sharing agreement, by which Sinclair would continue to retain both licenses on one multiplex. However, at the time, Sinclair was attempting to acquire Tribune Media, owner of WITI. It would not have been able to hold three licenses, but surrendering the WCGV-TV license would have allowed Sinclair to purchase WITI without regulatory scrutiny.

Sinclair, Weigel Broadcasting, and Milwaukee PBS decided on a switch date of January 8 for their various local spectrum moves, and WCGV left the airwaves at 5 a.m. that morning. At that time, getTV was dropped from a subchannel of WVTV to make way for the addition of "My 24" (24.1) and Comet (24.2) as WVTV subchannels, and Grit (carried as WCGV's third subchannel) was discontinued. However, the station has retained the existing channel 24 numbering for the "My 24" and Comet subchannels while losing the WCGV call sign for WVTV-DT2. The transition to a subchannel was properly coordinated, and resulted in no major change to its carriage position or channel on the majority of the market's cable systems and streaming providers such as YouTube TV and Hulu's Live TV service, with only a few small systems consolidating the station onto a lower subchannel tier.

Ultimately, the merger with Tribune (and with it, Sinclair's acquisition of WITI) was called off due to a number of issues on August 8, 2018, leaving WVTV as Sinclair's only Milwaukee over-the-air asset. In another deal, Sinclair would acquire a majority stake in the Fox Sports Networks in the fall of 2019, and with it, Fox Sports Wisconsin (now Bally Sports Wisconsin). 

Though the wind-down of WCGV did not allow the acquisition of WITI, the smooth transition of the station's main schedule to a WVTV subchannel resulted in Sinclair repeating the technique in a number of their markets to consolidate affiliations onto stations directly owned by Sinclair rather than its sidecar companies, especially with its Fox affiliates in major markets.

Programming
Syndicated programming featured on WVTV-DT2 includes Divorce Court, Celebrity Page, Access Daily, Lauren Lake's Paternity Court, Last Man Standing and The Simpsons (which has aired on the station since 1989; channel 24 ran first-run episodes of the series until it lost the Fox affiliation in December 1994, while syndicated reruns of The Simpsons have aired on the station since it entered into off-network syndication in September 1994). Sinclair's Ring of Honor wrestling promotion airs on Saturday nights on channel 24. The station also airs locally originated brokered programming on late Saturday evenings, including the Pro Wrestling Report, 414 Video Spotlight, and The Nerd Show, which are produced by the purchasers of the time at other studio facilities in the area. For the 2013–14 television season, the station aired weekday afternoon films, replacing repeats of Jerry Springer and Maury, which were replaced the next season by syndicated sitcoms. In 2014, the station began to air the national morning show The Daily Buzz on a two-hour delay from its national broadcast, which had previously been carried sporadically by WMLW-TV; notably until the show was sold off in 2013 by former owner and competing station group ACME Communications during its wind-down of operations, most Sinclair stations had never carried it. The sudden mid-April 2015 cancellation of The Daily Buzz forced channel 24 to quickly purchase barter lifestyle programming to fill the two hours vacated by the program.

On Saturdays, channel 24 airs MyNetworkTV's Thursday night lineup during football season or a syndicated film in prime time, as MyNetworkTV does not air programming on weekend evenings. The station had continued to air Milwaukee Bucks games, sharing rights with Fox Sports Wisconsin until the end of the 2006–07 season, when the team's games became cable-exclusive.

The station airs E/I programming from Litton Entertainment's Go Time block of programming formerly seen on Litton's Saturday morning network blocks, along with Wild America to fulfill the minimum amount of educational programming content required by the FCC. Channel 24 was the last true Milwaukee commercial station (Religious station WVCY, although technically a commercial licensee, does not solicit advertising) to sign off the air during the overnight hours, doing so for 4½ hours on early Monday mornings until March 10, 2008, when the station adopted a full 168-hour weekly schedule (although the early Monday morning schedule consists entirely of paid programming due to the lack of a Shepherd's Chapel program to air on Mondays); WVCY switched to a 24-hour programming schedule itself in January 2010. In the summer of 2020, WVTV-DT2 began to air Opry Live on a tape delay Saturday nights, a program which airs on Gray Television's subchannel network Circle, as Circle does not yet have an affiliation in the Milwaukee market.

Sports programming
In late August 2010, the station began to air a live high school football game telecast under the title Allstate Thursday Night Lights every Thursday evening as part of Sinclair's push for more local programming on its MyNetworkTV affiliates; these games are also traditionally aired as a radio "Game of the Week" over the web via WTMJ Radio's website, though both the WCGV and WTMJ broadcasts are not cross-promoted. The later broadcasts during the season were presented in the 480i widescreen format. For the 2011–12 season, the franchise was further extended to also cover Thursday night high school basketball games throughout the winter. In the fall of 2011, channel 24 also began to carry college basketball games distributed by Raycom Sports' ACC Network, which was the first program outside of network shows that the station has presented in high definition, and began to carry ACC football games the next season. In 2013, the station became the Milwaukee outlet for the Monday night show Locker Room, an unofficial Packers football analysis program produced by Green Bay's WFRV-TV. 2014 saw channel 24 become the Milwaukee outlet for Sinclair's internally run American Sports Network (now Stadium) package of college sports. Currently, Stadium has no host station in the market (though it is easily available through several streaming venues without cost), and channel 24 only carries the few Milwaukee Panthers men's basketball games which are cleared on Stadium as part of their broadcast agreement with the Horizon League, along with Saturday afternoon college football games beginning with the 2019 season after the move of all ACC rights to ESPN's ACC Network. In the summer of 2018 the station began to carry weekend home games for the Midwest League's Wisconsin Timber Rattlers, the Grand Chute-based Class A affiliate for the Brewers. The games are produced by sister station WLUK-TV in Green Bay and air on WCWF in that market. The fall of 2018 saw a further expansion of local sports coverage when the station began to carry weekend home games involving the American Hockey League's Milwaukee Admirals, the first time the team's games were broadcast on television (not counting Bradley Center-provided highlights to newscasts) since the early 90s.

Technical information

Subchannels
As mentioned above, the station shares WVTV's bandwidth and is officially recognized as a WVTV subchannel (including within station identifications, where it simply identifies as "WVTV Milwaukee" like 18.1; if going by actual physical channel without PSIP intervention, channel 24's three channels are 27.4, 27.5 and 27.6), but retains its own multiplexed channel map as channel 24:

On March 23, 2006, Sinclair announced that it signed an affiliation deal with music video network The Tube to carry it on the digital subchannels of many of the group's stations. The channel launched on WCGV's 24.2 subchannel on June 15, 2006. On December 31, The Tube was dropped by WCGV due to new E/I regulations put into effect by the FCC and The Tube not immediately inserting E/I programming within its schedule, effectively putting the burden on local stations to carry such programs; the network ceased operations on October 1, 2007, due to several factors likely including the discontinuance of the Sinclair carriage deal. None of the market's cable television providers ever carried 24.2 during its affiliation with The Tube.

On June 28, 2007, Time Warner Cable began carrying WCGV's digital signal locally on digital channel 524 (which has since moved to channel 1024), along with WVTV on digital channel 518 (which has since moved to channel 1018), after Sinclair and Time Warner came to a compensation agreement for the stations. Charter Communications, the market's other major cable provider, came to a compensation agreement in April 2007, but the HD signal was not added until June 9, 2009, when the HD signal began to air over digital channel 614 on Charter's southeastern Wisconsin systems.

In August 2010, Sinclair signed a groupwide affiliation deal with The Country Network (which rebranded as ZUUS Country in July 2013), a digital subchannel network featuring country music videos, to the 28 of the company's stations. WCGV relaunched its 24.2 subchannel as an affiliate of The Country Network on October 26, 2010 (the subchannel's E/I programming is handled at the network level). Charter Communications began carrying the subchannel on digital cable channel 964 on February 9, 2011 (currently 188), with Time Warner Cable following suit on September 27, 2011, placing it on digital channel 988. ZUUS's programming was replaced by that of the new Sinclair/MGM joint venture network Comet on October 31, 2015. The Country Network eventually was re-established after a split with ZUUS and returned to Milwaukee via a subchannel of WTSJ-LP (channel 38) in late 2016.

On January 1, 2015, WCGV launched Grit on their third subchannel, which was added to Charter systems on channel 178 on March 10, 2015. It was discontinued on January 8, 2018 upon the channel sharing with WVTV taking effect; WTMJ-TV took it for their fourth subchannel nearly immediately as described above.

Analog-to-digital conversion as WCGV-TV
On February 2, 2009, Sinclair told cable and satellite television providers via e-mail that regardless of the exact mandatory switchover date to digital-only broadcasting for full-power stations (which Congress rescheduled for June 12 days later), the station would shut down its analog signal on the original transition date of February 17. WCGV shut down its analog signal, over UHF channel 24, on that date. The station's digital signal continued to broadcasts on its pre-transition UHF channel 25. Through the use of PSIP, digital television receivers display the station's virtual channel as its former UHF analog channel 24.

As part of the SAFER Act, WCGV kept its analog signal on the air until March 4 to inform viewers of the digital television transition through a loop of public service announcements from the National Association of Broadcasters.

References

External links
 Official website
 

CGV-TV
Television channels and stations established in 1980
1980 establishments in Wisconsin
Television channels and stations disestablished in 2018
2018 establishments in Wisconsin
Defunct television stations in the United States